The Inside Passage is a coastal route for ships and boats along a network of passages which weave through the islands on the Pacific Northwest coast of the North American Fjordland. The route extends from southeastern Alaska in the United States, through western British Columbia in Canada, to northwestern Washington state in the United States. Ships using the route can avoid some of the bad weather in the open ocean and may visit some of the many isolated communities along the route. The Inside Passage is heavily travelled by cruise ships, freighters, tugs with tows, fishing craft, pleasure craft, and ships of the Alaska Marine Highway, BC Ferries, and Washington State Ferries systems. Coast Guard vessels of both Canada and the United States patrol and transit in the Passage. 

The term "Inside Passage" is also often used to refer to the ocean and islands around the passage itself.

Route

It is generally accepted that the southernmost point of the Inside Passage is Olympia, Washington, which is also the southernmost point of Puget Sound. Moving north, the passage continues into the waters of the greater Salish Sea. It then passes through the Strait of Georgia and Johnstone Strait, between northeastern Vancouver Island and the coast of mainland British Columbia. From there it continues further northwest into the Alaska Panhandle. The northernmost points of the Passage are Haines and Skagway at the head of the Lynn Canal. As a result of often uncertain weather, large tidal range, fast or unpredictable currents, and infrequent safe anchorages, navigating the Inside Passage can be difficult. 

During the Klondike Gold Rush the passage was one of the sea routes from Seattle and California, carrying American prospectors northward.

Today, approximately 36,000 recreational cruising boats utilize portions of the Inside Passage route.  The nonprofit Marine Exchange of Alaska plots and follows vessel traffic in the Alaskan section of the Inside Passage. Captain Warren Good has catalogued some 3,641 shipwrecks along the Alaska portion of the Passage. The Underwater Archeological Society of British Columbia conducts periodic Regional Shipwreck Surveys.

Washington portion
Washington's portion of the route is made up almost entirely of the waterways of Puget Sound. Starting from the southernmost point of Budd Inlet, the waterway turns toward the northeast and broadens as it becomes the Nisqually Reach of Puget Sound. The waterway then continues northeast, through the Tacoma Narrows, northward toward the San Juan Islands just southeast of the border with Canada.

British Columbia portion
British Columbia's portion of the route includes the narrow, protected Strait of Georgia between Vancouver Island and the B.C. mainland, the Johnstone Strait and Discovery Passage between Vancouver Island and the mainland, as well as a short stretch along the wider and more exposed Hecate Strait near Haida Gwaii (formerly the Queen Charlotte Islands). From Fitz Hugh Sound northwards, the route is sheltered from Pacific winds and waves by the various large islands in the area such as Princess Royal Island and Pitt Island. This section includes a series of channels and straits, from south to north: Fisher Channel, Lama Passage, Seaforth Channel, Milbanke Sound, Finlayson Channel, Sarah Passage, Tolmie Channel, Princess Royal Channel (includes Graham Reach and Fraser Reach), McKay Reach, Wright Sound, Grenville Channel, Arthur Passage, and Chatham Sound.

Alaska portion

The area encompasses 1,000 islands and thousands of coves and bays. While the Alexander Archipelago in Alaska provides some protection from the Pacific Ocean weather, much of the area experiences strong semi-diurnal tides. Lynn Canal is the northernmost waterway of the Inside Passage.

Tourism
The Inside Passage is a popular tourism destination. The coastal mountain ranges and islands offer wildlife viewing and opportunities for boating, fishing, kayaking, camping and hiking. Wildlife viewing in the region ranges from birding to whale watching and bear viewing. Designated bear viewing is available at Anan Creek near Wrangell and at Pack Creek Bear Sanctuary on Admiralty Island near Juneau.

The most popular way to explore the Inside Passage during summer is by cruise ship. Over 2 million people take cruises each year in this region, impacting the local economy significantly. Because there are few restrictions on ship size, all of the large main line cruise ships offer Inside Passage itineraries. Some of the major players include Norwegian, Disney, Princess, Celebrity Cunard, etc. Most of these cruises offer round-trips from either Vancouver or Seattle. Cruise ship travel in 2020 was cancelled due to the Coronavirus Pandemic and uncertainty continued through February 2022 when Canada had kept cruise ships banned.  

Although a smaller industry, there are also a handful of expedition cruises that explore the Inside Passage. These ships tend to be smaller than main line cruises and focus more on wildlife watching. National Geographic operate several expedition boats here.

1994 Transit Fee Crisis
During the salmon treaty negotiations in early 1994, Canada concluded that the United States was not responsive to Canada's concerns. 
Accordingly, on June 15, 1994, Canada imposed a transit fee on all US commercial fishing boats using the Canadian Inside Passage. This fee was eventually lifted through bilateral negotiations. The crisis remained peaceful and there were no violent incidents between US fishing boats and Canadian enforcement officials.

In response to the Canadian action, on October 24, 1995, the US Congress passed an amendment to the Fishermen's Protective Act, adding provisions permitting the U.S. government to directly reimburse US fishers for fines and other costs associated with seizures by foreign governments.

Cultural references
British author Jonathan Raban described his journey by boat through the Inside Passage from Seattle to Juneau in his 1999 travelogue Passage to Juneau: A Sea and Its Meanings.

In The Curve of Time (1961), Canadian travel writer M. Wylie Blanchet chronicled her travels by boat in the 1920s and 1930s with her five children throughout the Inside Passage waters between Vancouver Island and the mainland.  Blanchet's biographer states that the book has become "one of the leading books on cruising the Inside Passage from the southeast coast of Vancouver Island to Cape Caution".

See also

Southeast Alaska
British Columbia Coast
Alaska Marine Highway
BC Ferries
Washington State Ferries
MV Queen of the North
SS Princess Sophia

References

External links

 Travel information on Alaska's Inside Passage
 Inside Passage Photo Gallery
 Alaskan voyage of the Ulanah Photographic Album at Dartmouth College Library

Further reading
 

Alexander Archipelago
Bodies of water of Alaska
Coast of British Columbia
Tourism regions of Alaska
Water transport in British Columbia
Water transportation in Alaska